James Peak is a high mountain summit in the Front Range of the Rocky Mountains of North America. The summit is the tripoint of Clear Creek, Gilpin, and  Grand counties. The peak is the highest point in Gilpin County and the second highest in James Peak Wilderness.

James Peak is named after Edwin James, the botanist on Major Stephen H. Long's expedition of 1820.  James is the first known person to successfully climb Pikes Peak.

James Peak has a broad south slope that is very popular with hikers.  The steep, sheer walls of the east face, offer multiple technical couloirs for snow climbers, skiers, and snowboarders.  From south to north, these routes are named 'Bailout', 'Starlight', 'Sky Pilot', 'Shooting Star', and 'Superstar'.

See also

List of mountain peaks of Colorado
List of Colorado county high points

References

External links

James Peak on 13ers.com
James Peak on listsofjohn.com
James Peak on peakery.com
James Peak on summitpost.org

Mountains of Colorado
Mountains of Clear Creek County, Colorado
Mountains of Gilpin County, Colorado
Mountains of Grand County, Colorado
Arapaho National Forest
Roosevelt National Forest
Great Divide of North America
North American 4000 m summits